Back Door Blues is an album by the American saxophonist/vocalist Eddie "Cleanhead" Vinson with the Cannonball Adderley Quintet recorded in Chicago in late 1961 and New York in early 1962 and released by the Riverside label. The album was partially rereleased with additional recordings and alternate takes as Cleanhead & Cannonball on CD by Landmark Records in 1988 and the complete recordings issued on Fresh Sound in 2013.

Reception

AllMusic reviewer Thom Jurek stated: "Cleanhead sings his ass off and plays some alto with Cannonball. These dates reveal an anomaly in jazz at the time: The recordings are the place on the map where jazz and R&B meet head on, bringing the full force of their respective traditions and neither giving an inch. And it works so well ... Cannonball is excellent throughout; the R&B and blues idioms are all meat and potatoes for him, and he feels confident settling inside the groove without the need to push the boundary. Ironically, it's Vinson who compensates in that way. And the anchor in all of this is Zawinul, leading the rhythm section, condensing both musics to their most essential harmonics and tonalities, and building them out with a swinging style and cadence that are nothing short of remarkable ... Highly recommended". The Penguin Guide to Blues Recordings wrote that "the Adderley band of that period was very well suited to accompanying a blues singer like Vinson, and its approach is an elegant alternative to the jump-blues setting of his earlier recordings".

Track listing
All compositions by Eddie "Cleanhead" Vinson except where noted
 "Bright Lights, Big City" (Jimmy Reed) − 2:14
 "This Time" (Vinson, Ollie Jones) − 2:32
 "Hold It" − 4:15 Edited to 2:23 on original LP
 "Arriving Soon" − 6:27
 "Kidney Stew" (Vinson, Leona Blackman) − 4:15
 "Back Door Blues" − 2:16
 "Person to Person" − 2:44
 "Just a Dream" (Big Bill Broonzy) − 2:59
 "Audrey" − 4:41
 "Vinsonology" − 3:59
 "Cannonizing" − 6:28 Additional track on CD reissue
 "Bernices Bounce" − 6:18 Additional track on CD reissue
 "Kidney Stew" [Alternate Take #3] − 4:13 Additional track on CD reissue
 "Back Door Blues" [Alternate Take Unedited] − 3:33 Additional track on CD reissue
 "Vinsonology" [Alternate Take #2] − 4:03 Additional track on CD reissue
Recorded on September 19, 1961 at Ter Mar Studios, Chicago (tracks 3-6 & 9-15) and February 14, 1962 at Bell Sound Studios, New York City (tracks 1, 2, 7 & 8)

Personnel
Eddie "Cleanhead" Vinson − alto saxophone, vocals
Cannonball Adderley − alto saxophone
Nat Adderley − cornet
Joe Zawinul − piano
Sam Jones − bass
Louis Hayes – drums

References

Riverside Records albums
1962 albums
Eddie Vinson albums
Cannonball Adderley albums
Albums produced by Orrin Keepnews
Landmark Records albums